The canton of Feurs is a French administrative division located in the department of Loire and the Auvergne-Rhône-Alpes region. At the French canton reorganisation which came into effect in March 2015, the canton was expanded from 23 to 33 communes:

Chambéon
Châtelus
Chazelles-sur-Lyon
Chevrières
Civens
Cleppé
Cottance
Épercieux-Saint-Paul
Essertines-en-Donzy
Feurs
La Gimond
Grammond
Jas
Marclopt
Maringes
Mizérieux
Montchal
Nervieux
Panissières
Poncins
Pouilly-lès-Feurs
Rozier-en-Donzy
Saint-Barthélemy-Lestra
Saint-Cyr-les-Vignes
Saint-Denis-sur-Coise
Saint-Laurent-la-Conche
Saint-Martin-Lestra
Saint-Médard-en-Forez
Salt-en-Donzy
Salvizinet
Valeille 
Viricelles
Virigneux

See also
Cantons of the Loire department

References

Cantons of Loire (department)